Jacqueline Amanda Klein (born 28 January 1977) is a British art historian, broadcaster, and author. In 2016, she co-presented Britain's Lost Masterpieces for BBC4 with Bendor Grosvenor. She co-authored a book with her sister, Suzy Klein, entitled What is Contemporary Art? A Children's Guide, commissioned by the Museum of Modern Art, New York, and published in 2012 by Thames & Hudson. It has been translated into seven languages. In 2015, she was announced as Executive Editor at Tate Publishing, a role she left in 2018.

Selected publications
 The Bone Beneath the Pulp: Drawings by Wyndham Lewis. Paul Holberton Publishing, 2004. (With Paul Edwards) 
 Grayson Perry. Thames and Hudson, London, 2009. 
 What is Contemporary Art? A Children's Guide. Thames and Hudson, London, 2012.

References

External links

1977 births
Living people
Alumni of the University of Oxford
Women art historians
British broadcasters
British non-fiction writers
British book editors
Jewish women writers
British Jews
British television presenters
British art historians
British women historians
British women television presenters
Alumni of the Courtauld Institute of Art